Kate Cheeseman, is a BAFTA award-winning film director, known primarily for TV shows such as Pig Heart Boy, Casualty

She won the BAFTA (British Academy of Film and Television Arts) Children's Drama award 2000 for Pig Heart Boy.

Filmography

References

External links

 

 

Living people
Year of birth missing (living people)
British women television directors
Place of birth missing (living people)
Nationality missing